Ćavarov Stan is a village in a municipality of Tomislavgrad in Canton 10 of the Federation of Bosnia and Herzegovina, in Bosnia and Herzegovina.

Etymology 

Ćavarov is a possessive adjective form of the surname Ćavar, the common surname of the majority of inhabitants of the village. The surname itself is of Venetian origin, meaning a one-year-old ram. Stan in Croatian has multiple meanings, but in the name of the village it refers to a "rearers settlement with huts and sheepfolds during summer pasture".

Geography 

Ćavarov Stan is located at the centre of Duvanjsko polje. In the area of Glibina, between Kolo and Ćavarov Stan, there is a hydro-melioration system of canals, on about 800 ha, for drainage of waters in the riverbed of the river Šuica.

History 

Transhumance in the 1930s, when the village was founded, was still common in the region of Dinaric Alps, where Ćavarov Stan is located. Most of its inhabitants hale from Kazaginac, a village near the Buško Blato lake, who came to the area of Ćavarov Stan annually during the summer pastures. The majority of the first settlers were surnamed Ćavar, after whom the village was named.

Until the 1953 census, Ćavarov Stan was administratively part of Duvno, the urban centre. However, after the census, it became a separate settlement.

During the period of the socialist Yugoslavia, the village was home to the Review of Agricultural Products and the Review of the Cultural-Artist Work.

Demographics 

According to the 2013 census, its population was 343, all Croats.

Footnotes

Bibliography

Books

Journals

Websites 

 

Populated places in Tomislavgrad